C. Djeacoumar is an Indian politician from All India NR Congress. In May 2021, he was elected as a member of the Puducherry Legislative Assembly from Mangalam (constituency). He defeated Sun. Kumaravel of Dravida Munnetra Kazhagam by 14,221 votes in 2021 Puducherry Assembly election.

He served as a local administration minister in the DMK-TMC coalition government led by R V Janikaraman (DMK) between 1996 and 1999.

References 

Living people
Year of birth missing (living people)
21st-century Indian politicians
People from Puducherry
All India NR Congress politicians
Puducherry MLAs 2021–2026
Indian National Congress politicians